Majrashi is an Arabic surname. Notable people with the surname include:

Abdulaziz Majrashi (footballer, born 1991) (born 1991), Saudi Arabian footballer
 Abdullah Majrashi (footballer, born 1990), Saudi Arabian footballer
 Abdullah Majrashi (footballer, born 1997)
Eisa Majrashi (born 1986), Saudi Arabian judoka
Faisel Majrashi (born 1984), Saudi Arabian footballer
Naji Majrashi (born 1982), Saudi Arabian footballer
Talal Majrashi (born 1990), Saudi Arabian footballer

Arabic-language surnames